Guillermo Fratta Cabrera (born 19 September 1995) is a Uruguayan professional footballer who plays as a centre-back for Argentine Primera División club Gimnasia La Plata on loan from Rentistas.

Career
A youth academy graduate of Defensor Sporting, Fratta made his professional debut on 6 September 2015 in a 3–2 league win against rivals Danubio. Playing whole 90 minutes in the match, he opened his team's tally with a goal in fourth minute. He made his continental debut on 2 October 2015 in a 0–0 draw against Argentine side Lanús.

Fratta joined Boston River on loan prior to 2016 season.

Personal life
Guillermo's younger brother Mauricio is also a professional footballer.

Career statistics

Club

References

External links
 

1995 births
Living people
Uruguayan footballers
Uruguayan expatriate footballers
Uruguayan people of Italian descent
Association football defenders
Defensor Sporting players
Boston River players
C.A. Rentistas players
Club de Gimnasia y Esgrima La Plata footballers
Uruguayan Primera División players
Argentine Primera División players
Uruguayan expatriate sportspeople in Argentina
Expatriate footballers in Argentina